Francisco Ulises Rojas Rojas (born 22 July 1974) is a retired Chilean football player. He played most of his career as a left-back, despite being right-footed.

International career
Rojas represented Chile at under-20 level in 1993 alongside players such as Claudio Lizama, Claudio Villan and Marcelo Salas.

At senior level, Rojas was capped 31 times for the Chile national team between 1995 and 2005, including three games at the 1998 FIFA World Cup.

Personal life
His common nickname is "Murci", shortage of "Murciélago" ("Bat").

Honours

Club
Colo-Colo
 Primera División de Chile (3): 1996, 1997, 1998

References

External links 
 

1974 births
Living people
People from La Serena
Chilean footballers
Chilean expatriate footballers
Chile international footballers
Chile under-20 international footballers
Association football defenders
1998 FIFA World Cup players
Deportes La Serena footballers
Colo-Colo footballers
CD Tenerife players
SK Sturm Graz players
Unión Española footballers
Chilean Primera División players
La Liga players
Austrian Football Bundesliga players
Chilean expatriate sportspeople in Spain
Chilean expatriate sportspeople in Austria
Expatriate footballers in Spain
Expatriate footballers in Austria